Cora is a 1915 American silent drama film directed by Edwin Carewe and starring Emily Stevens, Edwin Carewe and Ethel Stewart.

Plot

Cast
 Emily Stevens as Cora 
 Edwin Carewe as George Garnier - Artist
 Ethel Stewart
 Frank Elliott

References

Bibliography
 Goble, Alan. The Complete Index to Literary Sources in Film. Walter de Gruyter, 1999.

External links
 

1915 films
1915 drama films
1910s English-language films
American silent feature films
Silent American drama films
Films directed by Edwin Carewe
American black-and-white films
Metro Pictures films
Films produced by B. A. Rolfe
1910s American films